Fissicrambus is a genus of moths of the family Crambidae.

Species
Fissicrambus adonis Bleszynski, 1963
Fissicrambus albilineellus (Fernald, 1893)
Fissicrambus alexanor Bleszynski, 1963
Fissicrambus artos Bleszynski, 1963
Fissicrambus briseis Bleszynski, 1963
Fissicrambus fissiradiellus (Walker, 1863)
Fissicrambus haytiellus (Zincken, 1821)
Fissicrambus hemiochrellus (Zeller, 1877)
Fissicrambus hirundellus Bleszynski, 1967
Fissicrambus intermedius (Kearfott, 1908)
Fissicrambus minuellus (Walker, 1863)
Fissicrambus mutabilis (Clemens, 1860)
Fissicrambus orion Bleszynski, 1963
Fissicrambus porcellus Bleszynski, 1967
Fissicrambus profanellus (Walker, 1866)
Fissicrambus quadrinotellus (Zeller, 1877)
Fissicrambus verselias Bleszynski, 1963

References

Crambini
Crambidae genera
Taxa named by Stanisław Błeszyński